The St. Lucia Solid Waste Management Authority (SLUSWMA) was established in October 1996 by an Act of Parliament No. 20 of 1996, in which the Authority was given the following mandate:

Manage, regulate, control and treat waste in Saint Lucia
Establish, maintain, improve and regulate the use sanitary landfills and facilities, in accordance with established scientific principles and practices
Establish and manage facilities for the collection and treatment of all including hazardous waste
Establish and maintain transfer stations
Establish and promote a resource recovery system
Oversee scheduling, safety and maintenance issues associated with solid waste management
Promote and oversee public education related to solid waste management in collaboration with the relevant ministries
Develop a network to receive, monitor and respond to public complaints.

Mission statement

To enhance Saint Lucia’s environmental integrity and the health of her people through the provision and management of an integrated system of public education and awareness and for the collection, treatment, recycling and disposal of solid and hazardous waste.

References

Environment of Saint Lucia
Organisations based in Saint Lucia
Waste organizations